Carl Jakobsson (born 13 July 2000) is a professional Swedish Ice Hockey player. He is currently playing with Oulun Kärpät in the Finnish Liiga.

He previously spent his professional career with Färjestad BK in the Swedish Hockey League (SHL). His youth team was Visby AIK.

Awards and honours

References

External links

2000 births
Living people
Färjestad BK players
Oulun Kärpät players
Swedish ice hockey goaltenders
People from Malmö Municipality
Sportspeople from Skåne County
21st-century Swedish people